Zosne is a genus of longhorn beetles of the subfamily Lamiinae containing the following species:

 Zosne cachita Heller, 1922
 Zosne cincticornis Pascoe, 1866
 Zosne matangensis Breuning, 1950

References

Saperdini
Cerambycidae genera